Run C&W was an American novelty  bluegrass group that was active in the early 1990s, playing mostly cover renditions of classic soul and R&B songs in a bluegrass or roots country style, including banjo, harmonica, washboard, and multi-part vocal harmonies. They also played a handful of original parody songs. The band's name is a mix of the abbreviation for the "country & western" music genre (C&W), and Run DMC, a popular hip-hop group of the time.

The band was composed of veteran musicians including lead vocalist Russell Smith, formerly of the Amazing Rhythm Aces; banjoist Bernie Leadon, formerly of the Eagles and the Nitty Gritty Dirt Band; along with Nashville songwriters Jim Photoglo and Vince Melamed, both of whom played various instruments. In performance and in the album artwork and liner notes, the members portrayed fictitious non-identical quadruplets The Burns Brothers, each with pun names: Crash'n Burns, G.W. "Wash" Burns, Side Burns, and Rug Burns. Their father was known as "Dad Burns" and their mother as Augusta "Au" Burns.

Run C&W recorded two albums, both on MCA Records: 1993's Into the Twangy-First Century, followed by 1994's Row vs. Wade, and filmed at least one music video.

Discography

Albums

Singles

Music videos

References 

American country music groups
American bluegrass music groups
MCA Records artists
Bands with fictional stage personas
Country music supergroups